Norah Story (1902 - March 5, 1978) was a Canadian archivist who won the Governor General's Award for English-language non-fiction in 1967 for her Oxford Companion to Canadian History and Literature.

Life
Born in England, Story emigrated to Canada in 1912. After attending high school in Guelph, Story earned a Bachelor of Arts in History at the University of Toronto in 1926. She completed a Master of Arts in 1927 at the University of Wisconsin. In 1928, Story joined the Public Archives of Canada, where she directed the Manuscripts Division from 1942 to her retirement in 1960.

Bibliography
The Oxford companion to Canadian history and literature, Oxford University Press, 1967, OCLC 663686963

References

1902 births
1978 deaths
Governor General's Award-winning non-fiction writers
Canadian archivists
Female archivists
British emigrants to Canada